Carlos Domínguez (1922–2008) was a Peruvian weightlifter. He competed in the men's heavyweight event at the 1948 Summer Olympics.

References

External links
 

1922 births
2008 deaths
Peruvian male weightlifters
Olympic weightlifters of Peru
Weightlifters at the 1948 Summer Olympics
Place of birth missing
20th-century Peruvian people